Quaver Nunatak is a small nunatak rising to about 250 m, lying in the northernmost exposure of the Walton Mountains, situated in the central portion of Alexander Island, Antarctica. The site was so named by the United Kingdom Antarctic Place-Names Committee in 1977 after the musical term, reflecting the small size of the feature and in association with the names of composers in this area.

See also

 Emerald Nunatak
 Franck Nunataks
 Vesta Nunataks

Nunataks of Alexander Island